NTE may refer to:
 National Teacher Examination, a past standardized test replaced by the Praxis test
 Near-term extinction, the prospect of an imminent end of the human species
 Network termination equipment
 Negative thermal expansion, a physicochemical process
 Not-To-Exceed, a pollution emission standard
 IATA code of Nantes Atlantique Airport
 Nord-Trøndelag Elektrisitetsverk, a power company in Norway
 Northern Tier Energy, an energy company in USA
 NTE Electronics, an electronic component supplier in the USA